Diggle railway station was a station that served the village of Diggle on the Huddersfield Line to the north of Uppermill. Immediately to the west of the Standedge tunnels, it was opened in 1849 along with the first rail tunnel and closed to passenger traffic in 1968. In its heyday, the station had platforms serving all four lines but little trace remains of it today—all of the buildings and much of platforms having been demolished (although the nearby signal box remains operational).

On 5 July 1923, an express passenger train was in a rear-end collision with a freight train. Four people were killed.

Local residents have periodically campaigned for the station to be reopened. This has often been connected to proposals to fully reopen the Standedge Tunnels.

In 2012, a renewed effort was launched by a local Liberal Democrat parish councillor. This was unsuccessful, as Transport for Greater Manchester concluded that much of the cited passenger demand would actually be abstracted from the existing station at nearby .

Notes

References 

An Illustrated History of Oldham's Railways by John Hooper

Disused railway stations in the Metropolitan Borough of Oldham
Former London and North Western Railway stations
Railway stations in Great Britain opened in 1849
Railway stations in Great Britain closed in 1968
Beeching closures in England
Saddleworth
1849 establishments in England